Prescot North is a Knowsley Metropolitan Borough Council Ward. The ward was created for the 2016 municipal election when the number of councillors on Knowsley Metropolitan Borough Council was reduced from 63 to 45.

The ward covers both parts of the Knowsley constituency and the neighboring St Helens South and Whiston constituency.

Councillors

Election Timeline

 indicates seat up for re-election.

Councillor Details

Election results

Elections of the 2010s

2018

2016

Notes

• italics denotes the sitting councillor • bold denotes the winning candidate

References

Wards of Merseyside
Metropolitan Borough of Knowsley